Wyden may refer to:

Wyden Castle, a castle in the Canton of Zurich, Switzerland
Peter H. Wyden (1923–1998), American journalist and writer
Ron Wyden (born 1949), American politician, United States Senator for Oregon, son of Peter H. Wyden above

See also
Weyden